Rick Hess could refer to: 

Richard Hess (born 1954), American Old Testament scholar
Frederick M. Hess (born 1968), American education writer